Dil Aur Deewaar is a 1978 Indian Hindi-language drama film, produced by D. Ramanaidu on Vijaya & Suresh Productions Combines banner and directed by K. Bapaiah. The film stars Jeetendra and Moushumi Chatterjee, with music composed by Laxmikant–Pyarelal. It is a remake of the Telugu film Jeevana Tarangalu (1973), also made by the same banner and director.

Plot 
Vijay is a valorous crime reporter who is a diehard to malefactors in society. He is fostered by his uncle Rai Saheb as his virago step-mother  expelled him in childhood. However, on her deathbed, she pleads for pardon from him and bestows the responsibility on her laid-back son Anand. Accordingly, Vijay shields Anand from the exploitations. Besides, Saroj an upright woman strives hard for a living and looks after her blind mother Parvati & younger brother Chandu. Owing to destitution Chandu turns as notorious and hooded by a dreadful gang headed by a devil. Meanwhile, destiny makes Saroj & Anand childhood friends, and Saroj treats him as his brother but he misinterprets her affection as love. Due to misapprehension, Vijay denounces Saroj as a woman of ill-repute. Here, Anand plans to marry Saroj but she clarifies her true feeling and he backs her. Being incognizant of it, Vijay marries Saroj in an unconscious state to protect Anand but as the woman of virtue, Saroj honours the wedding. Parallelly, Rao Saheb is annoyed with his vainglory daughter Lakshmi who scourges his father and crippled sister Rani. At that point, Anand places Saroj as governess to Rani and within no time she acquires their credence. Later, Anand divulges the fact to Vijay which makes him repent and start loving Saroj. One night, when Rao Saheb drops Saroj when he is impelled to see his wife Parvati but backs him because of their hatred. Distressed, Rai Saheb narrates the past to Vijay. Years ago, he reached the city for survival and met with an accident made by a rich woman Sudha. After recovery when he returns to his village, it is drowned. In that quandary, Sudha consoled and married him. Now, the boss ascertains Chandu to abduct Rani for ransom which he does so by assaulting Rai Saheb. Spotting it, Lakshmi blames Saroj and apprehends her. Listening to it, Parvati dies when Vijay aids Saroj as the backbone. Lakshmi also realizes her mistake after being aware of the truth. She immediately reaches the exchange spot and reforms Chandu but they are seized. At last, Vijay rescues them and unites the family. Finally, the movie ends on a happy note with the marriage of Vijay & Saroj.

Cast 
 Ashok Kumar as Rai Sahib
 Jeetendra as Vijay
 Moushumi Chatterjee as Saroj
 Rakesh Roshan as Chandu
 Vijay Arora as Anand
 Sarika as Laxmi
 Prem Chopra as Boss
 Nirupa Roy as Saroj & Chandu's Mother
 Kamini Kaushal as Vijay's Step-mother & Anand's Mother
 Jagdish Raj as Police Inspector
 Jagdeep as Kanhaiya
 Pinchoo Kapoor as Judge Raghunath
 Roopesh Kumar as Blackmailer
 Madhu Malini as Blackmailer's partner
 Komilla Wirk as Kitty
 Rajan Haksar as Inspector Rajan

Soundtrack 
Lyrics: Anand Bakshi

References

External links 
 

1978 films
1970s Hindi-language films
Films directed by K. Bapayya
Films scored by Laxmikant–Pyarelal
Hindi remakes of Telugu films
Suresh Productions films